Vladimir Abramovich Etush (6 May 1922 – 9 March 2019) was a Soviet and Russian film and theater actor of Jewish descent. People's Artist of the USSR (1984).

Personal life
Etush was married four times.

 Ninel Myshkova (born 1926; died 2003) — actress, the only daughter of General Konstantin Myshkov
 Yelena Izmaylova (born 1920; died 2005) — actress, civil marriage
 Nina Craynova (born 1927; died 2000) — English language teacher
 Yelena Gorbunova (born 1965) — English language teacher

He had a daughter, actress Raisa Etush (born 1955), from his marriage with Craynova.

Career

Partial filmography

 Admiral Ushakov (1953) as Capt. Said-Ali
 The Gadfly (1955) as Martini
 Vremya letnikh otpuskov (1961) as Mamedov
 The Chairman (1964) as Colonel Kaloyev
 Stewardess (1967) as Caucasian passenger
 Kidnapping, Caucasian Style (1967) as comrade Saakhov
 An Old, Old Tale (1968) as the king / innkeeper
 Solaris (1968, TV Movie) as Dr. Snaut
 Muzhskoy razgovor (1969) as dyadya Yura
 Staryy znakomyy (1969)
 The Twelve Chairs (1971) as Andrei Bruns
 Ten (1971) as Piestro, Annuanciata's father, hotel keeper, man eater
 Mission in Kabul (1971) as Abdulla-Khan
 Dela davno minuvshikh dney... (1972)
 Incorrigible Liar (1973) as Prince of Burukhtania Emir Burokhtan Second Second
 Ivan Vasilievich: Back to the Future (1973) as Anton Semyonovich Shpak, dentist
 Neylon 100% (1973) as Konstantin
 The Adventures of Buratino (1976, TV Movie) as Karabas Barabas
 How Ivanushka the Fool Travelled in Search of Wonder (1977) as Fakir
 Po ulitsam komod vodili... (1978) as Theatre Director
 31 June (1978, TV Movie) as Malgrim, Master of black and white magic
 Struktura momenta (1980) as Qoca Bayramov
 Dyuma na Kavkaze (1980)
 The Donkey's Hide (1982) as King Gaston IX
 Ne budite spyashchuyu sobaku (1991) as Grigoriy Matveevich Zhivoglaz
 Mechty idiota (1993) as Funt
 Bravye parni (1993) as Zhiguli's owner
 Classic (1998) as Monarch
 Park Sovetskogo perioda (2006)
 The Three Musketeers (2013) as Gerbier
 Ubezhat, dognat, vluybitsya (2015)

Honours and awards

 Medal of Zhukov
 1943 — Order of the Red Star
 1964 — Honored Artist of the RSFSR
 1971 — People's Artist of the RSFSR
 1984 — People's Artist of the USSR
 1985 — Order of the Patriotic War, 1st class
 Order "For Merit to the Fatherland":
1985 — 4th class for services to the state, the progress made in labor, science, culture, art, and a great contribution to strengthening friendship and cooperation between nations
2003 — 3rd class for his great contribution to the development of national culture and theater education'
2008 — 2nd class for his outstanding contribution to the development of theatrical art and many years of teaching activity
2018 — 1st class for his outstanding contribution to the development of theatrical art and many years of creative activity
 2001 — State Prize of the Russian Federation in Literature and Art for his role in the play Uncle's Dream (10 June 2002)
 2005 — Commander of the Order For Contribution to Victory
 2007 — Order of Saint Alexander Nevsky for Fatherland and writings 
 2008 — Order of Honorary Citizen of Russia
 2008 — Order of Diaghilev for the benefit of Russian culture
 Order of Peter the Great, 1st class
 2017 — Golden Mask

References

External links
 

1922 births
2019 deaths
20th-century Russian male actors
21st-century Russian male actors
Academicians of the Russian Academy of Cinema Arts and Sciences "Nika"
Communist Party of the Soviet Union members
Honored Artists of the RSFSR
People's Artists of the RSFSR
People's Artists of the USSR
Recipients of the Medal of Zhukov
Recipients of the Nika Award
Recipients of the Order of the Red Star
Full Cavaliers of the Order "For Merit to the Fatherland"
State Prize of the Russian Federation laureates
Jewish Russian actors
Russian drama teachers
Russian male film actors
Russian male stage actors
Russian male television actors
Russian people of Armenian descent
Russian people of Jewish descent
Soviet drama teachers
Soviet male film actors
Soviet male stage actors
Soviet male television actors
Soviet military personnel of World War II

Burials at Novodevichy Cemetery